Kang-Yell Choi is a professor of biotechnology at Yonsei University, and has a joint appointment position as a CEO of CK Regeon Inc. in Seoul, Korea. He has been performing researches related to cellular signaling, especially for the Wnt/β-catenin pathway involving various pathophysiologies. Choi has been leading the Translational Research Center for Protein Function Control (TRCP), a Korean government supported drug development institute, as a director for 10 years. Choi has been carrying out R&D to develop agents controlling the Wnt/β-catenin signaling pathway. Choi's main interest is development of the agents to treat intractable diseases that suppress tissue regeneration system through overexpression of CXXC5 and subsequent suppression of the Wnt/β-catenin signaling.

Education
Kang-Yell Choi completed his doctorate in biochemistry at Purdue University in 1993. Throughout his doctorate at Purdue University, his research in Escherichia coli purine repressor(PurR) played a key role in unveiling the structure of lactose repressor protein(LacI), which was one of the most interested proteins at the time. After completing his doctorate, Choi conducted research related to cell signaling at Harvard Medical School as a postdoctoral fellow. His research at Harvard investigated the function of Saccharomyces Ste5 involving pheromone response via MAP kinase pathway and was published as the 1st paper introducing the concept of "Scaffold protein” in the community.

Career and Research
In 1995, Kang-Yell Choi returned to Korea as a professor at Yonsei University. He served as the Chief of the National Research Laboratory and Molecular Complex Control at Yonsei University. Currently, he is positioned as the Director of the Translational Research Center for Protein Function Control (TRCP), which is supported by Korean National Research Foundation and Ministry of Science, ICT and Future Panning of Korea. Recently, he established CK Regeon Inc. to develop drugs for treatment of intractable diseases, such as NASH, bald, diabetic wounds, that suppress regenerative Wnt/β-catenin signaling by CXXC5 overexpression.

Cancer 
Choi identified a novel mechanism of Ras stability regulation via the Wnt/β-catenin signaling. The degradation of Ras, especially K-Ras, is controlled by GSK3-mediatedphosphorylation followed by ubiquitin-dependent proteasomal machinery via recruiting beta-TrCP E3 ligase. The stabilization of oncogenic K-Ras by APC loss and subsequent re-activation of the Wnt/β-catenin pathway via positive loop through ERK activated cancer stem cells and induced liver metastasis of colorectal cancer. This indicates the importance of inhibition of both Wnt/β-catenin and Ras-ERK pathways in the treatment of colorectal cancer. He subsequently identified and characterized small molecules degrading both beta-catanin and Ras via targeting the Wnt/β-catenin signaling, and those small molecules efficiently inhibit growth of colorectal and other cancers with activated Wnt/β-catenin and EGFR-Ras pathways.

CXXC5 and PTD-DBM 
Choi found that CXXC5, a negative feedback regulator of Wnt/β-catenin pathway which function via interaction with Disheveled (Dvl) at cytosol, is overexpressed in tissues of the bald scalp, diabetic wounds and aged skins such as chondrocytes of the terminating growth plate at teen. He demonstrated the ”CXXC5-Dvl protein-protein interaction (PPI)” as a target for development of agents enhancing wound healing and hair neogenesis by developing a PTD-DBM, a peptide recovers the suppressed Wnt/β-catenin signaling via blockade of the CXXC5-Dvl PPI. By topical application, the PTD-DBM peptide, especially when co-treated with a Wnt/β-catenin signaling activator such as valproic acid, induced neogenic hair growth and enhanced wound healing process.

The PTD-DBM peptide also revealed effective anti-aging effect of skin as shown by critical increment of collagen production with cell migration as well as its effects on suppression of ROS generation and apoptosis of skin cells in the tissues induced aging. The PTD-DBM peptide popularly has been used as agents for treatment of hair loss would-wide. Currently, Choi has been developing small molecules that mimic functions of the PTD-DBM by developing in vitro screening system detecting CXXC5-Dvl PPI, and several of candidates were selected and characterized for their capabilities enhancing neogenic hair growth, wound healing as well as the anti-aging effects etc.

Major Publications 

 5-FU promotes stemness ofcolorectal cancer via p53-mediated WNT/β-catenin pathway activation. Nature Communications. (2020)
 WDR76 is a RAS binding protein that functions as a tumor suppressor via RAS degradation. Nature Communications. (2019)
 β-Catenin-RAS interaction serves as molecular switch for RAS degradation via GSK3β. EMBO Reports. (2018)
 Targeting of CXXC5 by a Competing Peptide Stimulates Hair Regrowth and Wound-Induced Hair Neogenesis. Journal of Investigative Dermatology. (2017)
 Small molecule binding of the Axin-RGS domain promotes β-catenin and Ras degradation. Nature Chemical Biology. (2016)
 Small molecule inhibitors of Dishevelled-CXXC5 interaction are new drug candidates for bone anabolic osteoporosis therapy. EMBO Molecular Medicine. (2016)
 The Dishevelled-binding protein CXXC5 negatively regulates cutaneous wound healing. Journal of Experimental Medicine. (2015)
 CXXC5 is a negative-feedback regulator of the Wnt/β-catenin pathway involved in osteoblast differentiation. Cell Death and Differentiation. (2015)
 Oncogenic K-Ras Accelerates Cancer Stem Cell Activation via Aberrant Wnt/beta-catenin Signaling. JNCI-Journal of the National Cancer Institute. (2014)
 Ras Stabilization via Aberrant Activation of Wnt/b-catenin Signaling Promotes Intestinal Tumorigenesis. Science Signaling. (2012)
 MEK1/2 Inhibitors, AS703026 and AZD6244, may be potential therapies for K-ras Mutated Colorectal Cancer that Is resistant to EGFR Monoclonal Antibody Therapy. Cancer Research. (2011)
 Wnt5a Is Required for Endothelial Differentiation of Embryonic Stem Cells and Vascularization via Pathways Involving Both Wnt/β-Catenin and Protein Kinase Cα. Circulation Research. (2009)
 Ste5 thether multiple protein kinase in the MAP kinase cascade required for mating in Saccharomyces cerevisiae. Cell. (1994)
 Crystal structure of LacI member RurR, bound to DNA: Minor groove binding by α helices. Science. (1994)

External links
 Yonsei University, Biotechnology
 CK Regeon Inc.
 CXXC5
 PTD-DBM

References

Living people
South Korean scientists
Year of birth missing (living people)